is a Japanese figure skater who is now a coach. He competed in ice dancing with Tomoko Tanaka (his wife). They placed 18th in the 1988 Winter Olympic Games. They are three-time Japanese National Champions.

Competitive highlights

See also 
Figure skating at the 1988 Winter Olympics

External links 
Japan Figure Skating Instructor Association

1959 births
Living people
Japanese male ice dancers
Olympic figure skaters of Japan
Figure skaters at the 1988 Winter Olympics
People from Fukuoka Prefecture